Jesse Daley Smith (born May 27, 1936) is a former American football offensive tackle in the National Football League for the Philadelphia Eagles and Detroit Lions. He was named to the Pro Bowl one time.  Smith played college football at Rice University and was drafted in the second round of the 1959 NFL Draft.

References

1936 births
Living people
People from San Saba County, Texas
American football offensive tackles
Rice Owls football players
Philadelphia Eagles players
Detroit Lions players
Eastern Conference Pro Bowl players